Barbatula zetensis, also known as the Zeta stone loach, is a species of Cypriniformes fish in the genus Barbatula it is found in the drainage of the River Morača in the Lake Skadar basin in Montenegro. It is common in streams and rivers with stone bottom.

Footnotes 

 

zetensis
Fish described in 2001